On 28 August 2020, Houthi forces launched a ballistic missile and drone attack at a military camp in Marib Governorate, targeting Saudi-led coalition forces supporting the government of Abdrabbuh Mansur Hadi. The attack killed at least 5 Yemeni soldiers, other sources indicate 40 killed, another soldiers were reported injured.

Attack
The target was a mosque located on the grounds of a military training camp, previously attacked on January 2020. The attack took place during evening prayers when dozens of people were inside praying, according to military sources close to Hadi government forces.

See also
 January 2020 Ma'rib attack

References

Attacks in Asia in 2020
Attacks on buildings and structures in Yemen
Attacks on mosques in Asia
Houthi insurgency in Yemen
Marib Governorate
Military operations involving Yemen
Yemeni Civil War (2014–present)